Kopanki is a rural locality (a khutor) in Novopostoyalovskoye Rural Settlement, Rossoshansky District, Voronezh Oblast, Russia. The population was 212 as of 2010. There are 3 streets.

Geography 
Kopanki is located 17 km north of Rossosh (the district's administrative centre) by road. Beshchy is the nearest rural locality.

References 

Rural localities in Rossoshansky District